Slobozhanske is an urban-type settlement in Dnipro Raion of Dnipropetrovsk Oblast in Ukraine. The populated place is part of the Dnipro urban sprawl being its immediate northern suburb. Slobozhanske hosts the administration of Slobozhanske settlement hromada, one of the hromadas of Ukraine. Population:

History of settlement 
The first settlements on the territory of modern Slobozhanske appeared as early as the second millennium AD. At the dawn of history, it was home to many nomadic peoples and tribes. The Scythians, Sarmatians and ant-people of the Slavic tribe left their traces here, and with the formation of Kievan Rus, in the 9th-12th centuries, the paths to the south lay through the steppes.

Later, the wagon rolls along the Chumatsky Way left Poltava through Tsarichanka, Chumaky. In 1778, the settlement of Pidhorodne was formed, which has already grown into a city in our time. The origin of the name of the slobodka is connected with the fact that the sloboda was located near the provincial town of Katerynoslav (below the town).

Created in 1987 out of the neighboring city of Pidhorodne, the settlement was previously known as Yuvileine in honor of the "Great October" (the 1917 Russian Bolshevik coup-d'état) until 2016. It was renamed Slobozhanske by the Verkhovna Rada according to the law prohibiting names of Communist origin.

Creating a settlement hromada 
In 2015, the team of the Yuvileine settlement council sent all territorially adjacent village councils a proposal for unification within the framework of local self-government reform. Only one responded - the Stepnyanske village council, due to which the Yuvileine territorial community was formed, which was later renamed the Slobozhanske settlement community.

Objects of the social sphere 

 Secondary comprehensive school of the I-III degree
 First grade school
 Children's preschool educational institution
 Orphanage
 Outpatient clinic of family medicine
 Center of Culture and Leisure "Slobozhanskyi"
 Center for Social Support of Children and Families "Dobre vdoma"
 Sports complex "Slobozhanske".

Transportation 
The urban-type settlement is adjacent to the northern outskirts of the city of Dnipro between highways M04 and T0410. On the north-eastern side of the settlement is the park "Friendship of Peoples", which is now a forest park zone. The "Golden Keys" microdistrict was built to the north of the village. The closest railway station, Samarivka, is located on the railway connecting Dnipro and Kharkiv via Krasnohrad.

Sports 
At Slobozhanske based women's volleyball club "Prometey", the champion of Ukraine for the 2020/2021 season. Also, the champion of the Ukrainian basketball Super League of the 2020/2021 season, the men's basketball club "Prometey", performs here.

People from Slobozhanske 
 Denys Soroka (born 2001), Ukrainian footballer

Partnerships 

  Ādaži Municipality
  Dusheti Municipality
  Šakiai District Municipality
  Kupiškis District Municipality
  Shyroke village council
  Polohy city council
  Novoselytsa city council
  Manevychi settlement council
  Khotyn city council

References

External links 

 Official site

Urban-type settlements in Dnipro Raion
1987 establishments in Ukraine